The 2005 Cork Senior Football Championship was the 117th staging of the Cork Senior Football Championship since its establishment by the Cork County Board in 1887. The draw for the opening fixtures took place on 12 December 2004. The championship began on 9 April 2005 and ended on 23 October 2005.

Carbery entered the championship as the defending champions.

On 23 October 2005, Nemo Rangers won the championship following a 1-14 to 0-07 defeat of Muskerry in the final. This was their 14th championship title overall and their first title since 2002.

James Masters from the Nemo Rangers club was the championship's top scorer with 2-40.

Results

Round 1

Round 2

Aghada received a bye in this round.

Divisional section

Round 3

Round 4

Quarter-finals

Semi-finals

Final

Championship statistics

Top scorers

Overall

In a single game

References

Cork Senior Football Championship
Cork Senior Football Championship